Ward King Meese (March 9, 1897 – January 23, 1968) was a player in the National Football League. He played with the Milwaukee Badgers during the 1922 NFL season and the St. Louis All-Stars during the 1923 NFL season before being a member of the Hammond Pros for the following two seasons.  He also played for the Decatur Staleys while playing college football at the same time, playing Saturdays he would get on a train and play for Decatur on Sundays. 

The Staleys became the Chicago Bears shortly after he retired. His family included his son Robert Meese who had four children and seven grandchildren. His son Andy Meese played semi-pro football for the Wabash Express before a shoulder injury.

References

External links

Milwaukee Badgers players
St. Louis All-Stars players
Hammond Pros players
Wabash Little Giants football players
1897 births
1968 deaths
People from Van Wert, Ohio
Players of American football from Ohio